Seke District is a district of the Province Mashonaland East in Zimbabwe.

References

Districts of Mashonaland East Province